Lorena Amkie Cheirif (Mexico City, 1981) is a writer and journalist from Mexico, known for her Gothic Doll saga of juvenile novels. She also has a channel on YouTube.

Early years
Amkie was born in Mexico City in 1981. Her mother, a child therapist, helped her develop a taste for writing, using different techniques with her since she was five years old. With the support of her two parents towards her passion for reading, Amkie wrote her first novel at the age of 20, not finishing it until she was 27 years old. Initially wanting to study Literature or Philosophy, she decided to opt for a degree in Communications, thinking that with one of those careers she would not be able to obtain a job. During her days as a student, Amkie became a victim of bullying, an experience which years later would inspire her to write one of her novels.

Career
After graduating, Amkie worked in a magazine for some time, until she received a scholarship from the State of Mexico to write a book. With this scholarship, she began to dedicate full time to literature.

Her first book, Gothic Doll, was published in 2010, sold over 20,000 copies in Mexico and marked the beginning of her first trilogy, which continued with Gothic Soul and Gothic Fate, as well as Gothic More, an add-on with notes from the author that marked the end of the series in 2014. The plot of the trilogy, a story about a teenage vampire and her confrontation with reality, was born of the author's taste for the vampire literature.

Her next novel, El Club de los perdedores ("The Losers' Club") was published in 2015 and was well received by the critics and the market. Based on her own experiences, but also on frequent contact with her readers, Lorena explored topics such as bullying and the search for identity. 

In addition to publishing her books, Lorena has stood out for promoting reading to young audiences through various festivals, fairs, and her social networks.

Since 2016, Amkie has created her official YouTube channel, where she gives advice and tips to aspiring writers.

Works

References

Mexican writers
People from Mexico City
Mexican Jews
1981 births
Living people